Harpalus rufipalpis is a species of ground beetle in the subfamily Harpalinae. It was described by Sturm in 1818. Harpalus rufipalpis is native to Europe.

References

rufipalpis
Beetles described in 1818